Viking Airlines served the following destinations:

Africa
Egypt
 Sharm el-Sheikh International Airport
 Hurghada International Airport
 Luxor Airport
 Marsa Alam Airport
 Taba Airport

Asia
Cyprus
 Paphos International Airport
Iraq
Erbil International Airport
Baghdad International Airport
Sulaymaniyah International Airport
Lebanon
Beirut - Rafic Hariri International Airport

Europe
France
Bastia - Poretta Airport
 Chambéry Airport
Greece
 Athens Airport Base
 Chania Airport [seasonal]
Corfu - Ioannis Kapodistrias Airport
 Heraklion International Airport Base
 Kalamata Airport
 Kefalonia Airport
 Kos Airport
 Lemnos Airport
 Mykonos Airport
 Preveza Airport
 Rhodes International Airport
 Samos Airport
 Volos Airport
 Skiathos Airport
Zakynthos - Zakynthos International Airport, "Dionysios Solomos"
Portugal
Faro Airport
Spain
 Alicante Airport [seasonal]
 Almeria Airport
 Fuerteventura Airport 
Lanzarote - Arrecife Airport
Las Palmas - Gran Canaria Airport 
 Málaga Airport [seasonal]
 Murcia Airport
 Palma de Mallorca Airport
 Tenerife South Airport
Sweden
Stockholm - Arlanda Airport Base 
Switzerland
Geneva - Cointrin Airport
Turkey
 Dalaman Airport
United Kingdom
 Aberdeen Airport
 Belfast International Airport 
 Birmingham International Airport 
 Bristol Airport Base
 Glasgow International Airport Base
London - Gatwick Airport Base
 Manchester Airport Base
Manston - Kent International Airport

External links 
Viking Airlines

References 

Lists of airline destinations

sr:Редовне линије изиЏета